The Women's sprint competition at the 2019 FIL World Luge Championships was held on 25 January 2019.

Results
The qualification was held at 10:10 and the final at 14:36.

References

Women's sprint